Pinelopi Pavlopoulou (born 3 March 1996) is a Greek basketball player for Panathinaikos and the Greek national team.

She participated at the 2018 FIBA Women's Basketball World Cup.

Washington State statistics
Source

References

External links

1996 births
Living people
Greek expatriate basketball people in the United States
Greek women's basketball players
Olympiacos Women's Basketball players
Basketball players from Athens
Point guards
Washington State Cougars women's basketball players